A firehouse is a structure for storing firefighting apparatus.

Firehouse may also refer to:

Film
 Firehouse, a 1973 film starring Richard Roundtree
 Firehouse (1987 film), a 1987 film featuring film debut of Julia Roberts
 Firehouse (1997 film), a 1997 film starring Richard Dean Anderson

Music
 FireHouse, an American glam metal band formed in 1989
 FireHouse (album), a 1990 album by the band
 Firehouse, a song by Kiss from the 1974 album Kiss

Television
 Firehouse (TV series), a 1974 American television series

See also
 List of firehouses
 Firehouse Five Plus Two, a Dixieland jazz band popular in the 1950s
 Firehouse Subs, an American fast food restaurant chain
 Dalmatian (dog), also known as a firehouse dog